Interstate 470 (I-470) is a  loop of the Interstate Highway System that serves to link southeast Kansas City to Independence via Lee's Summit in Jackson County, Missouri. The western terminus of the freeway is at the Grandview Triangle interchange with I-49, I-435, U.S. Route 50 (US 50), and US 71 while the northern terminus is a cloverleaf interchange with I-70. The freeway travels west to east through southern Kansas City, curving toward the north at the Lee's Summit Municipal Airport and becoming concurrent with Route 291 as the highway travels north toward Independence.

An intermediate interchange with US 50 provides access to southern Jackson County and to Raytown to the north via Route 350, a former alignment of US 50 before the construction of I-470. Plans for a southern freeway were first published in 1955, and the first portions of I-470 were completed in 1970. By 1983, the entire freeway was open to traffic. Since construction, two new interchanges have been constructed, along with the expansion of the US 50 cloverleaf. In 2010, part of the freeway was closed by the Grandview Triangle due to a landslide underneath the freeway. Between 38,000 and 75,000 vehicles use the freeway on an average day.

Route description

I-470 begins in southern Kansas City at the Grandview Triangle interchange with I-49, I-435, US 50, and US 71. The freeway, concurrent with US 50, travels east through grasslands before meeting the westernmost interchange, a diamond interchange with Blue Ridge Boulevard. A rail line belonging to Kansas City Southern Railway passes under the freeway west of the interchange. The concurrent highways continue east through lightly populated Jackson County, past a light residential zone, toward an interchange with Raytown Road. Raytown Road provides access to Longview Lake to the south of I-470. Longview Lake was home to the Lollapalooza music festival in 1996.

Crossing into urbanized Lee's Summit, the Metropolitan Community College - Longview is accessible from the View High Drive interchange. The city line between Kansas City and Lee's Summit is near View High Drive. Exit 7 consists of a cloverleaf interchange with the southern end of Route 350 and US 50, as well as Northwest Blue Parkway and Northwest Pryor Road. Two rail lines surround the cloverleaf interchange, and, at one time, both were owned by the Union Pacific Railroad; however, only the eastern line is operational. The western line once belonged to the Chicago, Rock Island and Pacific Railroad and now is a rail trail after being sold to Jackson County. US 50 leaves the freeway and travels southeast as I-470 curves to the north near the Lee's Summit Municipal Airport.

A partial interchange with Northeast Colbern Road is quickly followed by a partial interchange with Route 291, which becomes concurrent with I-470 as it heads north toward Independence. Just north of the airport is an interchange with Strother Road, followed by an interchange with Woods Chapel Road. Lakewood Lakes, a pair of connected lakes, passes to the west of the freeway as it travels north. An interchange with Northeast Bowlin Road serves as an access road to Blue Springs Lake to the east of the freeway. US 40, which parallels I-70 through most of Missouri, is the penultimate exit, serving the southern portions of Independence and Blue Springs. US 40 is named after Corporal Michael E. Webster, a Missouri State Highway Patrol officer who was killed in the line of duty by a drunk driver. The northern terminus of I-470 is at a cloverleaf interchange with I-70 southwest of the Independence Center mall. The roadway continues north after the interchange with I-70 as Route 291 toward its ultimate end point at an interchange with I-435.

Every three years, the Missouri Department of Transportation (MoDOT) conducts a series of surveys on its highways in the state to measure traffic volume. This is expressed in terms of annual average daily traffic (AADT), which is a measure of traffic volume for any average day of the year. In 2009, MoDOT calculated that as few as 38,152 vehicles traveled along the highway at the northern terminus just north of the interchange with I-70 and as many as 75,647 vehicles used the highway just east of the Grandview Triangle. As part of the Interstate Highway System, the entire route is listed on the National Highway System, a system of roads that are important to the nation's economy, defense, and mobility.

History

Plans for a freeway linking southeast Kansas City to Independence were first published in 1955 in a document titled General Location of National System of Interstate Highways Including All Additional Routes at Urban Areas. The first portions of the highway that were signed I-470 were established in 1970, between I-70 and US 40 in Independence. The north–south portion of the highway, then designated US 71 Bypass (US 71 Byp.) had been in existence since 1970 and was renumbered to Route 291 between 1970 and 1971. Between 1979 and 1980, the portion of the freeway between the Grandview Triangle and the exit 7 cloverleaf had been completed. US 50's alignment was changed to follow I-470 west to the Grandview Triangle, and the old routing of US 50 was renumbered Route 350. The section of freeway between US 50 and Route 291 was opened to traffic in 1983, completing the route. Between 1980 and 1983, the portion of the route that is concurrent with Route 291 was upgraded to freeway standards and included in the I-470 loop.

Since construction of the highway, three interchanges have been added or expanded. The first addition was an interchange with View High Drive, which was constructed in early 1993, costing about $2 million (equivalent to $ in ) to complete. The second was an addition to the existing cloverleaf at US 50 in Lee's Summit, adding access roads to Pryor Road and Northwest Blue Parkway. Construction on that interchange began in July 2007 and was completed by September 2008. The third interchange, with Strother Road, was first planned to be constructed in 2008. The road served to provide access to the industrial park west of the freeway and to spur new development on land pending sale by the Church of Jesus Christ of Latter-day Saints to the east of the freeway. The interchange was opened to traffic in August 2010 at a final construction cost of around $18 million (equivalent to $ in ).

In July 2010, MoDOT closed the westbound lanes of I-470 near the Grandview Triangle due to large cracks that formed in the roadway. A buildup of ground water underneath the westbound lanes caused a  retaining wall to fall or fail. A landslide occurred on July 17 which created a  hole in the roadway. The eastbound lanes were not affected and were not closed. The affected area was replaced by a  bridge extension that opened in the following month.

Exit list

See also

References

External links

Interstate 470 in Missouri on Interstate-Guide.com
Interstate 470 in Missouri on Missouri Highways Route Log

4 (Missouri)
70-4 Missouri
70-4
Transportation in the Kansas City metropolitan area
Transportation in Jackson County, Missouri